Boy Gets Girl is a 2000 play by Rebecca Gilman. The play received its first production at the Goodman Theatre in Chicago in 2000.

Boy Gets Girl uses the story of what happens when a blind date turns into a living nightmare to examine stalking, sexism and the nature of the idea of romantic pursuit. Theresa Bedell is a smart, successful woman in her 30s, who writes for an upscale literary New York magazine. She is utterly devoted to her work and struggles with relationships.

Production history
Boy Gets Girl was first performed at the Goodman Theatre, on March 13, 2000. The cast was as follows:
Theresa Bedell - Mary Beth Fisher
Tony Ross - Ian Lithgow
Howard Siegel - Matt DeCaro
Mercer Stevens - David Adkins
Harriet - Shayna Ferm
Det. Madeline Beck - Ora Jones
Les Kennkat - Howard Witt

Directed by Michael Maggio, the sets were by Michael Philippi, costumes by Nan Cibula Jenkins, lights by John Culbert, sound by Michael Bodeen and Rob Milburn and Dramturgy by Susan V. Booth.

Plot
A friend sets Theresa up on a blind date with a nice guy named Tony who works in the computer industry. It is awkward, but not too awkward as Theresa accepts a second date. (They even find a couple things in common such as both being from the Midwest.) By the end of this date, she realizes that he is not right for her and politely excuses herself from the date. Tony continues to intrude further into Theresa’s life, with unexpected visits to Theresa’s office and unsettling phone messages at her home. Theresa starts to worry as she realizes that Tony knows where she lives. At her co-worker's urging, she calls the police, but when Officer Beck investigates, Theresa realizes there is not much that the police can do. Beck suggests moving out of her apartment and changing her name. Despite all her efforts to avoid him by hiding in her work and opening up to her colleagues, she eventually realizes that he has and will always have control over her life.  She eventually loses everything, including her identity, humanity, and will, as she changes her name and moves out of New York City to Denver, a shadow of the woman she once was.

Rebecca Gilman on Tony
"With Boy Gets Girl I felt that Tony would become scarier if we didn’t see him.  So if he was somehow out there, our imagination of him and of what he had become would be a lot scarier than the reality of him especially because I wanted him to be played by a very likeable actor."

Notable Productions
Goodman Theater, Chicago, 2000. Directed by Michael Maggio; starring Mary Beth Fisher.
Off-Broadway January 30, 2001 to April 8, 2001, presented by the Manhattan Theatre Club. Chicago cast and production, supervised by Lynne Meadow.
Royal Court Theatre, London, 2001. Directed by Ian Rickson; starring Katrin Cartlidge.
Dublin May 2003 produced by AboutFACE Theatre Company at the Civic Theatre, Tallaght.
 Northwestern University, Evanston, Illinois, 2006. Directed by Jason Tyne-Zimmerman
 Black Swan State Theatre Company, 2012. Directed by Adam Mitchell
 Wind Mill Grass Theatre, Hong Kong, 2018. Directed by Octavian Chan

Awards and nominations
 2001 Outer Critics Circle Award Nomination, John Gassner Award, Rebecca Gilman
 2001 Lucille Lortel Award:
 Outstanding Actress, Mary Beth Fisher (nominee)
 Outstanding Featured Actor, Howard Witt (nominee)
 2002 Olivier Award for Best New Play (nomination)

References

External links
Complete reviews of Boy Gets Girl
New York Times review(subscription required)
Guardian review

Plays by Rebecca Gilman
2000 plays